Colding-Walker House, also known as Robwood, is a historic home located at Appleton, Allendale County, South Carolina. The original section was built about 1853, and is a -story side gable roofed residence on a raised brick basement. It was extensively renovated in the late 1890s. The front façade features a full-width wrap-around porch and gable front portico embellished with Folk Victorian style spindlework detailing. Also located on the property are a carriage house, smokehouse, and barn.

It was added to the National Register of Historic Places in 1998.

References

Houses on the National Register of Historic Places in South Carolina
Victorian architecture in South Carolina
Houses completed in 1853
Houses in Allendale County, South Carolina
National Register of Historic Places in Allendale County, South Carolina